Danny Evans is an English former professional rugby league footballer who played in the 1990s and 2000s, and has coached in the 2000s and 2010s. He is the assistant coach of Featherstone Rovers in the Kingstone Press Championship. He has had three stints as temporary head coach at Featherstone Rovers.

Background
Danny Evans was born in Featherstone, West Yorkshire, England.

Playing career
Evans has played for Featherstone Rovers (captain) (Heritage № 726) and the Dewsbury Rams.

Testimonial match

Danny Evans's benefit season/testimonial match at Featherstone Rovers took place during the 2002 season.

References

External links
 (archived by web.archive.org) Featherstone Rovers profile

Living people
Batley Bulldogs players
Dewsbury Rams players
English rugby league coaches
English rugby league players
Featherstone Rovers coaches
Featherstone Rovers players
Rugby league players from Featherstone
Year of birth missing (living people)